The Rocky Mountain Rangers are a current infantry unit of the Canadian Forces.

Rocky Mountain Rangers may also refer to:
 Rocky Mountain Rangers (1885), a Canadian light cavalry unit of the North-West Rebellion

 Rocky Mountain Rangers (film), a 1940 Western film